Kym Taylor (born March 7, 1964) is an American politician. She is a member of the Maryland House of Delegates for District 23 in Prince George's County.

Career
Taylor graduated from the Duke Ellington School of the Arts in 1982. She later attended George Washington University, earning a Bachelor of Business Administration degree in information processing in 1986, and Atlanta University, where she received a Master of Business Administration degree in information systems and finance in 1988. Taylor runs her own health care company, where she works as a marketing executive. She also previously worked as an aide to state Senator Paul G. Pinsky.

In August 2021, Taylor filed to fill the vacancy left by the appointment of state Delegate Ron Watson to the Maryland Senate. The Prince George's County Democratic Central Committee voted on September 14 to nominate its chair, Cheryl S. Landis, to serve the rest of Watson's term; Taylor received one vote.

In 2022, Taylor ran for the Maryland House of Delegates in District 23. She ran on a ticket alongside Watson, state Delegate Marvin E. Holmes Jr., and Jocelyn Collins. She won the Democratic primary on July 19, coming in third with 14.0 percent of the vote and edging out her opponent, Jocelyn Collins, by 16 votes.

In the legislature
Taylor was sworn into the Maryland House of Delegates on January 11, 2023, with the start of the Maryland General Assembly's 445th legislative session. She is a member of the House Judiciary Committee.

Personal life
Taylor is married to her husband, Steve. In 2015, the Taylors purchased a $1.45 million home in Bowie, Maryland.

Electoral history

References

External links
 

1964 births
21st-century African-American women
21st-century African-American politicians
21st-century American politicians
21st-century American women politicians
African-American state legislators in Maryland
African-American women in politics
Atlanta University alumni
Democratic Party members of the Maryland House of Delegates
George Washington University alumni
Living people
Women state legislators in Maryland